The Lubec–Campobello Border Crossing connects the towns of Lubec, Maine and Welshpool, New Brunswick on the Canada–US border.  This crossing is located at the Franklin Delano Roosevelt Bridge.  Although a ferry connected Lubec with Campobello Island for many years, permanent border inspection facilities were not deployed until the bridge was completed in 1962.  The US operated out of a mobile home for the first two years.

The crossing is the easternmost on the border between the United States and Canada.

See also
 List of Canada–United States border crossings

References

Canada–United States border crossings
1962 establishments in Maine
1962 establishments in New Brunswick
Buildings and structures in Washington County, Maine